Lucas Arzán (born July 25, 1999) is a Puerto Rican football player who played as a midfielder for the Binghamton University soccer team, the Bearcats.

Career statistics

International

References

1999 births
Living people
Puerto Rican footballers
Puerto Rico international footballers
American soccer players
American sportspeople of Puerto Rican descent
Association football midfielders
Binghamton University alumni
Soccer players from New York City
Binghamton Bearcats men's soccer players